The 1987 European Cup final was a football match held at the Prater Stadium, Vienna, on 27 May 1987, that saw Porto of Portugal defeat Bayern München of West Germany 2–1. Both sides were missing key players: the Portuguese were without their injured striker Fernando Gomes, while the Germans were missing their sweeper, and captain, Klaus Augenthaler, who was suspended, along with striker Roland Wohlfarth and midfield player Hans Dorfner, who were both injured.

Porto won its first European trophy after fighting back from 1–0 down to win their first European Cup, with the goals coming from a back heel by Rabah Madjer and a volley from Juary, after a Ludwig Kögl header had given Bayern the lead in the first half. The final was the first European Cup final that Bayern, and their captain Lothar Matthäus would lose to successive late goals, repeated 12 years later in the 1999 UEFA Champions League final against Manchester United.

Route to the final

Match

Details

See also
1986–87 European Cup
1987 Intercontinental Cup
FC Bayern Munich in international football competitions
FC Porto in international football competitions

References

1
FC Bayern Munich matches
FC Porto matches
1986–87 in German football
1986–87 in Portuguese football
1987
1987
May 1987 sports events in Europe
1980s in Vienna
Sports competitions in Vienna